Waldemar Konrad von Zedtwitz (May 8, 1896 – October 5, 1984) was a German-born American bridge player and administrator.

Life

Von Zedtwitz was born in Berlin, Germany. His mother was Mary Elizabeth Breckinridge Caldwell, daughter of American businessman William Shakespeare Caldwell, one of Louisville's first millionaires by the late 1850s, and sister of Mary Gwendoline, Marquise des Monstiers-Mérinville. His father was Baron Moritz Curt von Zedtwitz, a German diplomat who belonged to the old Zedtwitz noble family, which rose under the Electorate of Saxony. His parents were married in June 1890. His father died in a boating accident on August 18, 1896, when he was just three months old.

He was educated at Berlin and Bern, and later served in the German cavalry during World War I.  He became a naturalized American citizen.

He was a lexicographer and linguist.

Von Zedtwitz was a keen backgammon player, winning a major tournament at age 82. He lived for 47 years in New York City before relocating to Hawaii in 1977. He died in Hawaii in 1984.

He was friends with Harold Vanderbilt, the inventor of contract bridge, and became an early and enthusiastic competitor and promoter of the game, including a tour of Europe.

Von Zedtwitz was 1932 president of the American Bridge League, one of the organizations whose merger established the American Contract Bridge League (ACBL) in 1937. The ACBL credits him with saving it by his emergency service as president in 1948 and 1949. He was a founder of the World Bridge Federation.

ACBL Hall of Fame 
Von Zedtwitz was inducted into its hall of fame by The Bridge World in 1966, which brought the number of members to nine. They were made founding members of the ACBL Hall of Fame in 1995.

 von Zedtwitz Award
The ACBL Hall of Fame established the von Zedtwitz Award to be given to living or deceased individual(s) who have achieved prominence in the game of bridge and have an outstanding tournament record but who may not have been in the limelight for a significant period of time. Each year, as many as two recipients may be selected by the Hall of Fame Committee whenever deemed appropriate.

Bridge accomplishments

Honors

 ACBL Hall of Fame, 1966

Wins

 North American Bridge Championships (20)
 Master Individual (1) 1936 
 von Zedtwitz Life Master Pairs (1) 1930 
 Wernher Open Pairs (1) 1946 
 Fall National Open Pairs (2) 1928, 1937 
 Vanderbilt (3) 1930, 1932, 1940 
 Barclay Trophy (1) 1948 
 Spingold (1) 1930 
 Masters Team of 4 (1) 1937 
 Chicago Mixed Board-a-Match (4) 1940, 1942, 1945, 1965 
 Reisinger (2) 1932, 1945 
 Spingold (3) 1941, 1947, 1953

Runners-up

 North American Bridge Championships
 von Zedtwitz Life Master Pairs (2) 1933, 1939 
 Wernher Open Pairs (2) 1938, 1953 
 Fall National Open Pairs (3) 1933, 1942, 1955 
 Vanderbilt (6) 1937, 1938, 1943, 1945, 1946, 1960 
 Spingold (1) 1933 
 Masters Team of 4 (1) 1936 
 Mitchell Board-a-Match Teams (1) 1952 
 Chicago Mixed Board-a-Match (3) 1933, 1935, 1956 
 Reisinger (7) 1930, 1933, 1938, 1939, 1941, 1942, 1964 
 Spingold (5) 1940, 1945, 1949, 1950, 1963

See also  
  John Lancaster Spalding

Notes

References

External links
 
 

1896 births
1984 deaths
American contract bridge players
American lexicographers
Linguists from the United States
Zedtwitz, Waldemar
Zedtwitz, Waldemar
Sportspeople from New York City
20th-century linguists
20th-century lexicographers